Thomas Charles Benfield (1889 – 19 September 1918) was an English professional footballer who played in the Football League for Leicester Fosse and Derby County as a forward.

Career 
An outside right and inside forward, Benfield played for local Leicester clubs before Second Division Leicester Fosse bought him out of the Army for £25 in July 1910. Over the course of the following four seasons he made 111 appearances, scored 23 goals and was notable for scoring the first goal scored at Arsenal Stadium on 6 September 1913. Benfield moved to local newly relegated Second Division rivals Derby County in June 1914 and had an excellent 1914–15 season, scoring 15 goals (including a brace in a 6–0 away win over Leicester Fosse on 28 December 1914) and helping the Rams to immediate promotion back to the First Division. The suspension of competitive football at the end of the 1914–15 season brought Benfield's professional career to an end, but he remained with the club and played his final wartime match on 16 March 1918. He also guested for Nottingham Forest and Grimsby Town during the war.

Personal life 
Prior to becoming a professional footballer, Benfield served in the Sherwood Foresters between 1905 and 1910. As of 1914, he was living in Leicester with his wife Elsie. After the outbreak of the First World War in 1914, Benfield enlisted in the Leicestershire Regiment and was serving as a sergeant when he was shot by a sniper in the area of Équancourt and Heudicourt, Somme on 11 September 1918, during the Hundred Days Offensive. He died of his wounds following an operation on 19 September, just under two months before the Armistice and was buried in Varennes Military Cemetery. As of November 2012, Ben Swift, Benfield's great-grand-nephew, was an employee of Leicester City.

Career statistics

Honours 
Derby County
 Football League Second Division: 1914–15

References

1918 deaths
Royal Leicestershire Regiment soldiers
British Army personnel of World War I
British military personnel killed in World War I
English footballers
Leicester City F.C. players
Derby County F.C. players
1889 births
Footballers from Leicester
English Football League players
Association football inside forwards
Association football outside forwards
Association football wing halves
Deaths by firearm in France
Military personnel from Leicester

Sherwood Foresters soldiers
Nottingham Forest F.C. wartime guest players
Grimsby Town F.C. wartime guest players